Mildred Dresselhaus ( Spiewak; November 11, 1930 – February 20, 2017), known as the "Queen of Carbon Science", was an American nanotechnologist. She was an Institute Professor and Professor Emerita of physics and electrical engineering at the Massachusetts Institute of Technology. Dresselhaus won numerous awards including the Presidential Medal of Freedom, the National Medal of Science, the Enrico Fermi Award and the Vannevar Bush Award.

Early life and education 
Dresselhaus was born on November 11, 1930, in Brooklyn, New York City, the daughter of Ethel (Teichtheil) and Meyer Spiewak, who were Polish Jewish immigrants. Her family was heavily affected by the Great Depression so from a young age Dresselhaus helped provide income for the family by doing piecework assembly tasks at home and by working in a zipper factory during the summer. As a grade school student, Dresselhaus' first 'teaching job' was tutoring a special-needs student for fifty cents a week, and she learned how to be a good teacher.

Dresselhaus credited New York's free museums, including the American Museum of Natural History and the Metropolitan Museum of Art, with sparking her interest in science. She and her brother, Irving Spiewak,  were scholarship students at the Greenwich House Music School which introduced her to a different world of musical, artistic and intellectual leanings.

Dresselhaus was raised and attended grade school in the Bronx. Her older brother informed her of the opportunity to apply to Hunter College High School, where she excelled and gained practice as a teacher by tutoring fellow students.

Experience at Hunter College 
Dresselhaus attended Hunter College in New York. Traditionally a women's college, during Dresselhaus's time as a student there, Hunter College's Bronx campus opened itself to a flood of male G.I. Bill beneficiaries. Dresselhaus later explained:
The boys in the science classes were toward the bottom of the class... They always used to come to me for help.... That might be somewhat significant in my story, because I never got the idea in college that science was a man's profession.
While attending Hunter, one of her professors, and future Nobel-Prize-winner Rosalyn Yalow took interest in Dresselhaus and encouraged her to apply for graduate fellowships and pursue a career in physics. Dresselhaus graduated with her undergraduate degree in liberal arts in 1951.

After College 
She carried out postgraduate study at the University of Cambridge on a Fulbright Fellowship and Harvard University, where she received her MA from Radcliffe College. She received a PhD from the University of Chicago in 1958 where she studied under Nobel laureate Enrico Fermi. She then spent two years at Cornell University as a postdoc before moving to Lincoln Lab as a staff member.

Career and legacy 
Dresselhaus had a 57-year career at the Massachusetts Institute of Technology. She became the Abby Rockefeller Mauzé Visiting Professor of electrical engineering at MIT in 1967, became a tenured faculty member in 1968, and became a professor of physics in 1983. In 1985, she was appointed the first female Institute Professor at MIT As the exotic compounds she studied became increasingly relevant to modern science and engineering, she was uniquely positioned to become a world-leading expert and write one of the standard textbooks. Her groundwork in the field led to Andre Geim and Konstantin Novoselov isolating and characterizing graphene, for which they were awarded the 2010 Nobel Prize.

Dresselhaus was awarded the National Medal of Science in 1990 in recognition of her work on electronic properties of materials as well as expanding the opportunities of women in science and engineering. In 2005 she was awarded the 11th Annual Heinz Award in the category of Technology, the Economy and Employment. In 2008, she was awarded the Oersted Medal. In 2012, she was co-recipient of the Enrico Fermi Award, along with Burton Richter, and was awarded the Kavli Prize "for her pioneering contributions to the study of phonons, electron-phonon interactions, and thermal transport in nanostructures." In 2014, she was awarded the Presidential Medal of Freedom and was inducted into the US National Inventors Hall of Fame in 2014. In 2015, she received the IEEE Medal of Honor.

In 2000–2001, she was the director of the Office of Science at the U.S. Department of Energy. From 2003 to 2008, she was the chair of the governing board of the American Institute of Physics. She also has served as president of the American Physical Society (APS), the first female president of the American Association for the Advancement of Science, and treasurer of the National Academy of Sciences. 

Her former students include such notable materials scientists as Deborah Chung and physicists as Nai-Chang Yeh and Greg Timp.

There are several physical theories named after Dresselhaus. The Hicks-Dresselhaus Model  (L. D. Hicks and Dresselhaus) is the first basic model for low-dimensional thermoelectrics, which initiated the whole band field. The SFDD model (Riichiro Saito, Mitsutaka Fujita, Gene Dresselhaus, and Mildred Dresselhaus) first predicted the band structures of carbon nanotubes. The Dresselhaus effect refers, however, to the spin–orbit interaction effect modeled by Gene Dresselhaus, Mildred Dresselhaus's husband.

Dresselhaus devoted a great deal of time to supporting efforts to promote increased participation of women in physics. In 1971, Dresselhaus and a colleague organized the first Women's Forum at MIT as a seminar exploring the roles of women in science and engineering. In honor of her legacy, the  APS created the Millie Dresselhaus Fund to support women in physics. Dresselhaus was the face of a 2017 General Electric television advertisement which asked the question "What if female scientists were celebrities?" aimed to increase the number of women in STEM roles in its ranks.

In 2019, the Institute of Electrical and Electronics Engineers (IEEE) Board of Directors created the IEEE Mildred Dresselhaus Medal, awarded annually "for outstanding technical contributions in science and engineering, of great impact to IEEE fields of interest."

Contributions to scientific knowledge
Dresselhaus was particularly noted for her work on graphite, graphite intercalation compounds, fullerenes, carbon nanotubes, and low-dimensional thermoelectrics. Her group made frequent use of electronic band structure, Raman scattering and the photophysics of carbon nanostructures. Her research helped develop technology based on thin graphite which allow electronics to be "everywhere", including clothing and smartphones.

With the appearance of lasers in the 1960s,  Dresselhaus started to use lasers for magneto-optics experiments, which later led to the creation of a new model for the electronic structure of graphite. A great part of her research dedicates to the study of 'buckyballs' and graphene focusing a great deal in the electrical properties of carbon nanotubes and enhancing thermoelectric properties of nanowires.

Personal life 

Her first husband was physicist Frederick Reif. She was then married to Gene Dresselhaus, a well known theoretician and discoverer of the Dresselhaus effect. They had four children – Marianne, Carl, Paul, and Eliot – and five grandchildren.

Honors and awards
Honorary Degree of Doctor of Science from the ETH Zurich, 2015 
IEEE Medal of Honor, 2015 (first female recipient) 
National Inventors Hall of Fame induction 2014
Presidential Medal of Freedom, 2014
Honorary Degree of Doctor of Science, The Hong Kong Polytechnic University, Hong Kong, 2013
Von Hippel Award, Materials Research Society, 2013
Kavli Prize in Nanoscience, 2012
Enrico Fermi Award (second female recipient), 2012
Vannevar Bush Award (second female recipient), 2009
ACS Award for Encouraging Women into Careers in the Chemical Sciences, 2009
Oliver E. Buckley Condensed Matter Prize, American Physical Society, 2008
Oersted Medal, 2007
L'Oréal-UNESCO Awards for Women in Science, 2007
Heinz Award for Technology, the Economy and Employment, 2005
IEEE Founders Medal Recipients, 2004
Karl Taylor Compton Medal for Leadership in Physics, American Institute of Physics, 2001
Medal of Achievement in Carbon Science and Technology, American Carbon Society, 2001
Honorary Member of the Ioffe Institute, Russian Academy of Sciences, St. Petersburg, Russia, 2000
National Materials Advancement Award of the Federation of Materials Societies, 2000
Honorary Doctorate from the Catholic University of Leuven, Belgium, February 2000
Nicholson Medal, American Physical Society, March 2000
Weizmann Institute's Millennial Lifetime Achievement Award, June 2000
SGL Carbon Award, American Carbon Society, 1997
Member of the American Philosophical Society, 1995
National Medal of Science, 1990
Member of the National Academy of Sciences (U.S.), 1985
Member of the American Academy of Arts and Sciences, 1974
Society of Women Engineers Achievement Award, 1977
Fellow, Norwegian Academy of Science and Letters

Selected publications

References

External links
 Freeview video interview with Mildred Dresslhaus by the Vega Science Trust
 Millie Dresselhaus Fund
 Homepage
 
 Archive of Dresselhaus's MIT page

 Mildred Dresselhaus   Video produced by Makers: Women Who Make America

1930 births
2017 deaths
American nanotechnologists
American women physicists
American women engineers
Fellows of the American Academy of Arts and Sciences
Fellows of the American Association for the Advancement of Science
Fellows of the American Physical Society
Honorary Fellows of the Institute of Physics
Members of the United States National Academy of Engineering
Members of the United States National Academy of Sciences
Presidential Medal of Freedom recipients
Enrico Fermi Award recipients
L'Oréal-UNESCO Awards for Women in Science laureates
National Medal of Science laureates
MIT School of Engineering faculty
Radcliffe College alumni
Hunter College alumni
Hunter College High School alumni
University of Chicago alumni
Cornell University alumni
American materials scientists
Jewish American scientists
People from Brooklyn
21st-century American physicists
20th-century American physicists
21st-century American women scientists
Carbon scientists
American people of Polish-Jewish descent
MIT Lincoln Laboratory people
Members of the Norwegian Academy of Science and Letters
Scientists from New York (state)
Kavli Prize laureates in Nanoscience
Oliver E. Buckley Condensed Matter Prize winners
American women academics
IEEE Medal of Honor recipients
21st-century American Jews
Burials at Mount Auburn Cemetery
20th-century American women
Members of the American Philosophical Society
Presidents of the American Physical Society